Leptacris is a genus of grasshoppers in the family Acrididae, subfamily Hemiacridinae; species have been recorded from Africa and tropical Asia.

Species
The Catalogue of Life lists:
Leptacris filiformis Walker, 1870 - type species (locality  India, Maharashtra)
Leptacris javanica Willemse, 1955
Leptacris kraussi Bolívar, 1890
Leptacris liyang Tsai, 1929
Leptacris maxima Karny, 1907
Leptacris monteiroi Bolívar, 1890
Leptacris taeniata Stål, 1873

References

Acrididae genera
Orthoptera of Africa
Orthoptera of Asia